Schroders plc is a British multinational asset management company, founded in 1804 based in London, England. The company employs over 5,000 people worldwide in 32 locations around Europe, America, Asia, Africa and the Middle East. It is traded on the London Stock Exchange and is a constituent of the FTSE 100 Index.

Schroders bears the name of the Schröder family, a prominent Hanseatic family of Hamburg with branches in other countries. The Schroder family, through trustee companies, individual ownership and charities, control 47.93 per cent of the company's ordinary shares.

History

Schroders' history began in 1804 when Johann Heinrich Schröder (John Henry) became a partner in J.F. Schröder & Co, the London-based firm of his brother, Johann Friedrich (John Frederick), founded in 1800. In 1818 J. Henry Schröder & Co. was established in London.

During the American Civil War, Schroders "issued £3m bonds in 1863 for the Confederacy."

Key events in the development of the business include the establishment of J. Henry Schroder Banking Corporation ('Schrobanco') as a commercial bank in New York in 1923. 

The J. Henry Schroder Banking Corporation provided significant funding to Adolf Hitler during the 1920's. A subsidiary of J. Henry Schroder Banking Company, J. M. Stein Bankhaus, was responsible for managing the personal bank accounts of Hitler, as well as those of other SS members. Johann Heinrich Kurt Frhr. von Schröder, great grandson of Johann Heinrich Schröder, working in a subsidiary bank to the J. Henry Schröder Banking Corporation, had,

F.C. Tiarks, a partner of J. Henry Schröder & Co. and managing director of the Schroder Bank, was a member of the Nazi-friendly Anglo-German Fellowship. According to author John Hargrave in his biography of Montagu Norman, F.C. Tiarks attented a meeting organized by Montagu Norman in 1934, where they agreed to include Hitler in their plans to finance Europe. However, it is important to note that John Hargrave is not an historian.

Further key events included the public offering of the shares in J. Henry Schroder & Co. Ltd on the London Stock Exchange in 1959 and the acquisition of Helbert, Wagg & Co, a leading issuing house, in 1962.

In 1986 the company disposed of Schrobanco, its commercial banking arm in New York and acquired 50% of Wertheim & Co., a mid-tier New York based investment bank, whose activities more closely mirrored those of the London business.

Schroders played a leading role in the privatisations carried out by the UK Government in the 1980s and was to grow dramatically under Winfried Bischoff. Schroders was worth £30 million when he took over as CEO in 1984; in 2000 the company sold its investment banking division to Citigroup for £1.3 billion.  Citigroup's European investment banking arm traded as Schroder Salomon Smith Barney from 2000 to 2003.

In 2013, Schroders purchased the capital management arm of Cazenove in a deal worth £424 million.

Schroders bought the London-based Sandaire Investment Office in September 2020.

Schroders announced in June 2021 that it was uniting its specialist private assets capabilities under the newly launched Schroders Capital brand.

Current operations
In April 2012, Schroders acquired a 25% stake in Axis Mutual Fund.

In December 2021, the firm signed up to the UN's Women Empowerment Principles, an initiative to support women in the workplace which was founded by the United Nations Global Compact and UN Women.

As at 31 December 2021, Schroders was responsible for assets worth £615.2 billion on behalf of clients including corporations, insurance companies, local and public authorities, charities, pension funds, high-net-worth individuals and retail investors.

Collaboration with universities
In June 2014, Schroders' Multi-Asset Investments and Portfolio Solutions (MAPS) announced a collaboration with Professor Anthony G. Constantinides, Director of the newly created Imperial College Financial signal processing Laboratory (FSP).

Notable current and former employees

Business
Geoffrey Bell – chairman of Guinness Mahon (1987–1993) and founder of the Group of Thirty
Winfried Bischoff – chairman of Lloyds Banking Group (2009–2014)
Andrew Knight – editor of The Economist (1974–1986)

Politics and public service
David Ogilvy, 13th Earl of Airlie – Lord Chamberlain (1984–1997)
Sir Gordon Richardson – governor of the Bank of England (1973–1983)
James Wolfensohn – president of the World Bank (1995–2005)
Sir John Henry Bremridge KBE, JP, MA – financial secretary of Hong Kong (1981–1986). Sir John Henry Bremridge served as a non-executive director of Schroders plc.

Other
Avery Rockefeller – member of the Rockefeller family
Frank Cyril Tiarks – director of the Bank of England (1912–1945); and High Sheriff of Kent (1927)

References

Further reading

External links

British companies established in 1804
Investment banks
Former investment banks
Companies listed on the London Stock Exchange
Investment management companies of the United Kingdom
Financial services companies based in the City of London
Banks established in 1923
1804 establishments in England